William Alexander Reid  (1857–1940) was a second baseman in Major League Baseball for the 1883 Baltimore Orioles and 1884 Pittsburgh Alleghenys of the American Association.  He continued to play in the minor leagues through 1888.

Sources

1857 births
1940 deaths
19th-century baseball players
Major League Baseball second basemen
Baltimore Orioles (AA) players
Pittsburgh Alleghenys players
Minneapolis Millers (baseball) players
Cleveland Forest Cities players
Duluth Jayhawks players
Sandusky Fish Eaters players
Baseball people from Ontario